Olga Sergeevna Kucherenko (born 5 November 1985) is a Russian long jumper.

Career 
She won the bronze medal at the 2009 European Indoor Championships. She also competed at the 2008 World Indoor Championships without reaching the final. Her personal best jump is 7.13 metres, achieved in May 2010 in Sochi. She has 6.87 metres on the indoor track, achieved in January 2008 in Krasnodar.

In 2011, she won the silver medal in the world championships in Daegu with a result of 6.77 m. However, this results was subsequently annulled due to a failed drug test. A 2016 retest of the sample she gave at the competition came back positive as a result of improved detection processes. She received a two-year ban from the sport and her results from the period 28 August 2011 to 28 August 2013 were removed from the records.

Competition record

Notes

External links 
 

1985 births
Living people
Russian female long jumpers
World Athletics Championships medalists
European Athletics Championships medalists
Athletes stripped of World Athletics Championships medals
Doping cases in athletics
Russian sportspeople in doping cases
21st-century Russian women